is a Japanese TV game show where members of the group Kanjani8 tackled different tasks assigned by the unseen president of the company. The show aired every Wednesday on TV Asahi from 01:36 AM to 01:51 AM from 7 October 2009 to 31 March 2010.

The show 
To open each episode, the narrator states that due to the horrible economic situation, a show production team with very low budget seeks help from seven of their ADs, aka the members of Kanjani8. The ADs are to complete the tasks passed down from their president, of the company named KANPANI.
On the official website for the show as well as at the beginning of every episode, the message below is also shown:
    KANPANI is the abbreviation of the KANJANI COMPANY, a television production office that specializes in image and music. Everyone of us makes good use of their physical strength, intellect and acting talents to conduct independent inquiry and data gathering. We promptly transmit helpful information and survey results to the society, which you can use even from tomorrow. Moreover, we produce musical program ID, which will meet viewers' needs widely without being caught in a mere entertainment program production. Hereafter, we "KANPANI" will produce the new sensed entertainment program that everybody from kids to adults can enjoy, to make you audience happier.
The truthfulness behind these words remain unknown, but the lack of a background on the set of the show seems to verify the statement claiming a slow budget.
The show then begins by stating the task or challenge of the day, which is said to be given by the unseen president. All members must then participate in achieving the goal. 
So far, none of the tasks had been completed.
After the game, a fax is received on the set, with a verdict from the president stating the name and possibly reasons of the member(s) receiving the punishment for the team failure.

Cast 
Kanjani8 (hosts)

(You Yokoyama | Subaru Shibutani | Shingo Murakami | Ryuhei Maruyama | Shota Yasuda | Ryo Nishikido | Tadayoshi Okura)

Nakamiti Mihoko (Narrator)

Broadcasting details

Tasks/challenges

Music 
The opening, ending, and in-between music segments are created and performed live by Kanjani8.
Background music for the show comes from Kanjani8's previously released music numbers.

References

External links 
 Kanpani Official website (Japanese)

2009 Japanese television series debuts
2010 Japanese television series endings
Japanese variety television shows
Kanjani Eight
TV Asahi original programming